Postal codes in Latvia are 4 digit numeric and use a mandatory ISO 3166-1 alpha-2 country code (LV) in front, i.e. the format is “LV-NNNN”.

See also 
 ISO 3166-2:LV
 Subdivisions of Latvia

Latvia
Communications in Latvia